Orrin McKinze Gaines II (born March 2, 1998) is an American professional soccer player who plays as a forward for Major League Soccer club Charlotte FC.

Career
Gaines grew up in the Austin area where he played youth soccer for Lonestar Soccer Club.
On August 12, 2017, Gaines made his professional debut against Jahn Regensburg in the DFB-Pokal.

On July 8, 2019, Gaines signed with Sonnenhof Großaspach.

Gaines joined Hannover 96 ahead of the 2020–21 season, starting with the team's reserve squad. He made his debut for the first team against SC Paderborn in the 2. Bundesliga. He left the club ahead of the 2021–22 season.

Austin FC
On July 14, 2021, Gaines began trialing with Major League Soccer club Austin FC, coming on as a substitute in the club's friendly against Tigres UANL. A couple weeks later, on July 30, Gaines officially joined Austin FC.

Charlotte FC
On December 14, 2021, Gaines was selected by Charlotte FC in the 2021 MLS Expansion Draft.

Career statistics

References

External links
 

1998 births
Living people
American soccer players
Soccer players from Austin, Texas
United States men's youth international soccer players
American expatriate soccer players in Germany
Association football midfielders
SV Darmstadt 98 players
FSV Zwickau players
SG Sonnenhof Großaspach players
Hannover 96 II players
Hannover 96 players
Austin FC players
Charlotte FC players
2. Bundesliga players
3. Liga players
Regionalliga players
American expatriate soccer players
Major League Soccer players